Cornesia molytes is a species of moth of the family Tortricidae. It is found in Kenya.

The wingspan is about 12 mm. The ground colour of the forewings is cream, almost entirely shining silver, suffused with greenish in the dorsal half. There are brown dots along the costa and dorsum. The pattern is green, edged with whitish green, accompanied by a costal more ochreous brown mark. The hindwings are grey.

References

Endemic moths of Kenya
Moths described in 1993
Tortricini
Moths of Africa
Taxa named by Józef Razowski